Hill Middle School may refer to:

David Lee “Tex“ Hill Middle School of North East Independent School District in San Antonio, Texas
Thayer J. Hill Middle School  of Indian Prairie School District 204 in Naperville, Illinois
Hill Middle School in the Long Beach Unified School District in California.
Hill Middle School in the Novato Unified School District in Novato, California